Qezel Qash (also Romanized as Qezel Qāsh; also known as Qīzīlgash) is a village in Aq Kahriz Rural District, Nowbaran District, Saveh County, Markazi Province, Iran. At the 2006 census, its population was 14, in 5 families.

References 

Populated places in Saveh County